Benaud is a surname. Notable people with the surname include:

 John Benaud (born 1944), Australian cricketer
 Richie Benaud (1930–2015), Australian cricketer and cricket commentator and writer